William Vertue (died 1527) was an English architect specialising in Fan vault ceilings.

Along with his brother Robert, he was involved in the construction of the Tower of London (1501–1502), Bath Abbey, the Vertue brothers are reported as telling Bishop Oliver King the patron of the work that the vaulting "Ther shal be no one so goodeley, neither in England nor in France" and the vaulting and the clerestory windows and walls of the Henry VII's chapel at Westminster, between 1506 and 1509, though Robert Virtue was dead by then and William is thought to be entirely responsible.

He advised John Wastell about the design for the fan vaulted ceiling at King's College Chapel, Cambridge,. The fan vault over the crossing at St George's Chapel, Windsor Castle in 1528 finished after his death was his last known architectural work.

Gallery of architectural work

References

Architects from Somerset
Gothic architects
1527 deaths
Year of birth unknown
15th-century English people
16th-century English architects